Hurricane Edouard was the strongest hurricane of the 1996 Atlantic hurricane season, reaching winds of  on its path. Edouard remained a major hurricane for eight days, an unusually long amount of time. A Cape Verde hurricane, the storm formed near the coast of Africa in the middle of August. It moved westward then curved northward, and persisted until early September when it became extratropical to the southeast of New England. Edouard was originally forecast to strike the northeast United States, but it produced hurricane-force gusts to portions of southeastern Massachusetts while remaining offshore. The winds caused minor damage totaling $20 million. In addition, the hurricane generated strong waves and rip currents to coastlines, killing two people in Ocean City, MD and causing numerous injuries.

Meteorological history

A tropical wave moved off the coast of Africa on August 19, accompanied with spiral bands of convection around an area of low pressure. Initial forecasts predicted for great intensification, including one forecast for the depression to strengthen to a hurricane within three days. However, the depression remained disorganized, and slowly intensified to attain tropical storm status on August 22.

After becoming a tropical storm, Edouard quickly strengthened due to the establishment of an upper-level anticyclone over the storm. The storm moved to the west in response to a strong subtropical ridge to its north, and Edouard strengthened into a hurricane on August 23. Due to very favorable conditions, the hurricane rapidly strengthened on August 24 and August 25 to peak as a  Category 4 hurricane on the Saffir-Simpson Scale. For three days during this time, Edouard maintained Category 4 intensity, though weakened late on August 28 due to an eyewall replacement cycle and vertical shear.

A mid-tropospheric trough turned the hurricane to the north to an area of unfavorable conditions, and Edouard weakened to a Category 3 hurricanes on August 31. On September 1, the hurricane passed about midway between Bermuda and Cape Hatteras, and turned to the north-northeast. Edouard weakened to tropical storm status on September 3, and became extratropical shortly thereafter while located to the south of Nova Scotia. As an extratropical storm, Edouard turned to the east, then moved around the periphery of a larger extratropical storm until becoming absorbed by the storm early on September 7.

Preparations
A high pressure system over New England resulted in the possibility that Edouard would track to the west and strike the United States. This caused Cape May County officials to contemplate ordering an evacuation for the busiest tourist weekend of the year, though an evacuation never occurred. Due to the possibility for a landfall on the East Coast of the United States, officials at the National Hurricane Center issued Tropical Storm and Hurricane Watches and Warnings from Cape Lookout, North Carolina to Eastport, Maine at various times. Tropical storm warnings existed from North Carolina to Watch Hill, Rhode Island and from the mouth of the Merrimack River to the United States/Canada border, while hurricane warnings existed from Watch Hill, Rhode Island to Merrimack River, Massachusetts. Hurricane watches were also issued for the tropical storm warning area.

In North Carolina, Cape Lookout was closed and evacuated prior to the storm's passage.
Because a Hurricane Watch existed for the New York City metropolitan area, New York Mayor Rudy Giuliani urged citizens to take preparations. In addition, city officials set up a hurricane helpline, activated the city's Emergency Command Center at the Police Headquarters, and distributed leaflets to flood-prone areas. Near New Bedford, Massachusetts, where landfall was predicted to occur, schools were prepared as shelters in case of a direct hit. New Bedford Mayor issued a state of emergency for the city. However, few people stayed in shelters during the storm's passage. On Cape Cod, thousands of tourists and summer residents evacuated in preparation for the storm, resulting in an  traffic backup. As a result, many beach resorts lost millions in potential revenue. Of those who remained on Cape Cod, 900 stayed in emergency shelters when the storm passed the area. In Boston's Logan International Airport, numerous flights were cancelled or delayed to move planes to safety. Many sailors removed their boats from the water prior to the storm. At one time in Mattapoisett Harbor, workers removed boats at a rate of one every eight minutes. In Maine, the Red Cross opened several emergency shelters, though they were never used. Like in Massachusetts, sailors removed their boats, and due to media coverage, residents were well-prepared for the hurricane.

Impact
Despite initial predictions, Edouard's effects were much less than expected. Strong waves struck much of the East Coast of the United States, killing 2 and injuring numerous others. In 2011 the National Hurricane Center reported that Edouard had caused a total of US$20 million with the greatest damage occurring on Cape Cod, where moderate wind gusts resulted in $4.6 million (2007 USD).

Carolinas and Mid-Atlantic
In South Carolina, minor beach erosion was reported in Charleston and Colleton Counties. Minor beach erosion occurred. Moderate winds of up to  blew down a few trees and caused shingle damage to buildings. In Delaware, rough surf closed numerous coastal beaches, while storm tides and waves flooded a campground near the Indian River in Sussex County. Strong waves in New Jersey killed two people and seriously injured another. Lifeguards made numerous rescues along the coast, while other beaches were closed or had restrictions on bathing.

In New York, Edouard produced strong waves and storm tides of one to two ft (0.3 to 0.6 m), causing overwash along southern Long Island due to high tide. Coastal flooding occurred, including in Hampton Bays where the waves flooded one road and covered another with sand. The flooding trapped six cars, while the strong waves forced several beaches to close. Because the hurricane moved through the New York Shipping Channel, numerous ships reported winds of over hurricane status, though winds remained below tropical storm force on land. A boat capsized off the coast of Jones Beach Island, though its passengers were not injured. A Celebrity Cruises cruise ship, the MV Zenith suffered damage from 30 to 50 ft (nine to 15 m) waves, injuring several passengers and crew members. Rainfall was minimal, peaking at less than a half of an inch in eastern Long Island.

New England and Canada

Hurricane Edouard passed about /h) southeast of Nantucket while moving at only , much slower than previous New England hurricanes. This resulted in several hours of strong waves, winds, and rain. Edouard also produced tropical storm force winds across much of Massachusetts, as well as one hurricane-force gust on Nantucket. The strong winds caused power outages to 2/3 of Nantucket, all of Martha's Vineyard for six hours, and most of Cape Cod for several hours. Power outages, effecting 35,000 to 40,000 were reported throughout Massachusetts, though far from the power outages caused by Hurricane Bob five years prior. The winds also downed numerous trees, and blew off the roof of the fire station in Hyannis. The rainfall produced minor street flooding. Damage on Cape Cod totaled to $3.5 million (1996 USD, $4.6 million 2007 USD).

In Maine, heavy surf closed several beaches and injured two people. Waves also damaged several boats. The winds knocked over several trees and caused sporadic power outages throughout the state, including loss of power for 1,900 Portland residents. In Kittery, water fell through an office building, damaging computer equipment.

The hurricane also caused beach erosion on southeastern Nova Scotia.

See also

 Other storms of the same name
 List of Category 4 Atlantic hurricanes
 Hurricane Bill (2009)
 Hurricane Earl (2010)
 Hurricane Katia (2011)
 Hurricane Jose (2017)

References

Edouard (1996)
Edouard (1996)
Edouard (1996)
Edouard (1996)
Edouard (1996)
1996 in New Jersey
1996 natural disasters in the United States
August 1996 events
September 1996 events